Richard Ehrenborg is a Swedish mathematician working in algebraic combinatorics.  He is known for developing the quasisymmetric function of a poset. He currently holds the Ralph E. and Norma L. Edwards Research Professorship at the University of Kentucky  and is the first recipient of the Royster Research Professor at
University of Kentucky.

Ehrenborg earned his Ph.D. from MIT in 1993 under the supervision of Gian-Carlo Rota.
He is a descendant of another  , (born 1655) who was a professor and Rektor of Lund University. He is also a juggler and magician.

Selected publications

See also
Four glasses puzzle

External links

References 

Year of birth missing (living people)
Living people
20th-century Swedish mathematicians
University of Kentucky faculty
Massachusetts Institute of Technology alumni